Mjelde is a surname. Notable people with the surname include:

Erik Mjelde (born 1984), Norwegian footballer
Maren Mjelde (born 1989), Norwegian footballer
Mons Ivar Mjelde (born 1967), Norwegian footballer
Ole Monsen Mjelde (1865–1942), Norwegian politician
Sigmund Mjelve (1926–1995), Norwegian writer